Earl Avery Thompson (July 1, 1891 – April 20, 1967) was an American engineer and inventor who had a goal to make driving the automobile safer by reducing the effort required to shift the manual transmission of the day. Thompson even wanted to automate the process of shifting the transmission. Two of his most notable achievements towards that goal are listed on this page:

Early life and career
Thompson was born in Elgin, Oregon, on July 1, 1891. He was educated at Oregon State College where he majored in mechanical and electrical engineering. Thompson worked for General Motors Corporation (GM) from 1929–1940. Thompson left GM May 1, 1940, to begin his own business, the E.A. Thompson Manufacturing Co. In Ferndale, Michigan. Thompson manufactured the Thompson Automatic Profiling Milling machine which is used by manufacturers in the production of arms, plane, tank, and gun parts.  Thompson died April 20, 1967, at the age of 75 in Bloomfield Hills, Michigan.

Notable achievements

The synchromesh transmission
Thompson's 1918 invention of a synchromesh manual transmission using a tapered cone synchronizer to prevent gear clash (US Patent US1435430 in March 1922) would make shifting a manual transmission faster, easier and safer. In April of 1922 Thompson, armed with drawings and data for a prototype synchromesh transmission, set out for Detroit to sell it to the automobile industry. But the automobile manufacturers were not impressed; their customers, he was told, were satisfied with transmissions just as they were. Thompson persisted. After several trips between Oregon and Detroit, and months spent improving the design, and two more patent applications, he was finally able to arrange a meeting with Lawrence Fisher, managing director of Cadillac Motor Car Division and Ernest Seaholm, Cadillac's chief engineer. They were interested in the idea, and (in 1924) Thompson was retained as a consultant while the transmission was perfected (10 models in all).

The first cars to use Thompson's synchromesh transmission design were Cadillac and LaSalle cars in 1928, then Buick 8's in 1931. Thompson sold his synchromesh transmission patents to GM in 1924 and 1930 for a reported $1 million.

Thompson became an employee of Cadillac Motor Car Division on September 1, 1929, and was appointed to be assistant chief engineer. Thompson continued improving the design of the synchronizer. In 1933. Thompson began working on the development of an automatically shifting transmission. Thompson left Cadillac in 1934 and joined the General Motors Corporation (GM) Engineering Department.

GM Automatic Safety Transmission Development
In 1934 at the GM Engineering Department, Thompson became the project leader of a group of four engineers including Ralph F. Beck, William L. Carnegie, Walter B. Herndon, and Maurice S. Rosenberger. This group developed the Automatic Safety Transmission, an optional semi-automatic transmission for some 1937–1939 Oldsmobile and 1938 Buick vehicles.

GM Hydra-Matic Transmission Development
In June 1936 a fifth engineer, "O.K." Oliver K. Kelley, joined Thompson's group; he was transferred from G.M.C. Truck and Coach Division where the development of a hydraulic torque converter drive for a transit bus was proceeding. Thompson's group combined a fluid coupling with a unique hydraulically controlled, automatically shifting 4-speed planetary transmission, introduced as an option on 1940 Oldsmobiles as Hydra-Matic, the world's first mass-produced fully automatic transmission. The 1940 Hydra-Matic transmission would continue to be refined and produced for another 16 years, including wartime use in some military vehicles.

Awards
Recipient of the Elmer A. Sperry Award in 1963 for design and development of the first successful automatic automobile transmission

Manual transmission patents
 1918/1922 US Patent US1435430 for an Automatic gear-shifting mechanism for sliding gear transmission
 1923/1937 US Patent US2101825 for an Automatic Gear Shifting Mechanism
 1925/1932 US Patent US1888640 for a Transmission

Automatic transmission patents

Thompson was awarded 22 patents. Nine of his patents were directly related to the development of the Hydra-Matic transmission
 1933/1942 US Patent US2285760 for Change Speed Gearing with Automatic Overdrive
 1934/1940 US Patent US2195605 for Change Speed Transmission and Control
 1935/1940 US Patent US2193304 for Change Speed Mechanism and Control
 1937/1940 US Patent US2193305 for Brake and Clutch Capacity Control
 1937/1940 US Patent US2193524 for Change Speed Gearing and Control
 1937/1944 US Patent US2362418 for Clutch and Gearing Control
 1938/1940 US Patent US2204872 for Change Speed Gearing and Control
 1940/1945 US Patent US2380680 for Clutch and Control
 1940/1947 US Patent US2430258 for Rotary Hydraulic Coupling of the Turbine Type

External links

1891 births
1967 deaths
20th-century American engineers
Oregon State University alumni
People from Union County, Oregon
20th-century American inventors